Maverick Carter is an American sports-marketing businessman and media personality.

Early life and education
Maverick Carter was born on October 10, 1980. He spent most of his youth in Akron, Ohio and Atlanta, Georgia. Carter grew up the son of Katherine Powers, a social worker, and Otis Carter. He is a longtime friend of LeBron James; both played basketball and football at St. Vincent–St. Mary High School (SVSM) in Akron. After graduating from SVSM, Carter played college basketball for one season at Western Michigan before transferring to the University of Akron and focusing on other endeavors.

Career
Carter interned with Nike, withdrawing from college to become a Nike field representative. He has served as James' business manager since 2006. Carter, along with James, Rich Paul, and Randy Mims, is one of the founders and principals of agent and sports-marketing company LRMR. Carter was responsible for engineering The Decision, a television special.

Carter arranged a deal between LRMR and Fenway Sports Group that secured James a partial stake in Liverpool F.C. and bolstered his overseas profile. He also developed The LeBrons series of commercials featuring caricatures of James. He and James also founded SpringHill Entertainment, a collaborator of Warner Bros. whose projects include the Disney XD series Becoming, the Starz series Survivor's Remorse, the NBC game show The Wall, the Bleacher Report spinoff Uninterrupted, and Space Jam: A New Legacy. In 2021, Carter parlayed a deal whereby he and James each gained part ownership stakes of the Boston Red Sox.

He was an executive producer, alongside James and Drake, of Hubert Davis's 2022 documentary film Black Ice.

References

African-American businesspeople
Businesspeople from Akron, Ohio
Western Michigan Broncos men's basketball players
Nike, Inc. people
African-American television producers
American men's basketball players
St. Vincent–St. Mary High School alumni
Basketball players from Akron, Ohio
Television producers from Ohio
Businesspeople from Atlanta
Basketball players from Atlanta
Television producers from Georgia (U.S. state)
Living people
Fenway Sports Group people
Date of birth missing (living people)
Place of birth missing (living people)
21st-century African-American people
Year of birth missing (living people)